Flight test instrumentation (FTI) is monitoring and recording equipment fitted to aircraft during flight test. It is mainly used on experimental aircraft, prototype aircraft and development aircraft - both military and civil, and can monitor various parameters from the temperatures of specific components to the speed of the engines. This may be displayed in the cockpit or cabin to allow the aircrew to monitor the aircraft in flight, and is usually recorded to allow the data to be analysed later.

FTI typically monitors between 10 and 120000 parameters - for example temperatures inside the cargo and pressure distribution along the wing. FTI sources could be temperature sensors, pressure probes, voltages, current transducers, potentiometers, strain gauges, aircraft data buses or cameras. These sensors may be digitalized and acquired by the data acquisition system. A cockpit audio recording may also be included. A telemetry transmitter may be added to the FTI to allow real-time monitoring of the tests from a ground-station.

A core component of a data acquisition system are the data acquisition units (DAU). These are electronic boxes that interface to FTI sources and are typically designed to be rugged and reliable. The current trend is to make these units as small as possible and move them closer to the sensors. This leads to many challenges for the designers of a data acquisition chassis such as how to cope with inhospitable environments and maintain functionality with smaller designs. For the end user it means shorter wiring, better accuracy and easier installation and maintenance.

So called commercial off-the-shelf (COTS) systems are commonly used to keep costs low and speed delivery. This approach, and indeed the use of FTI originally developed for aerospace applications well within the earth’s atmosphere, is also increasingly common for space launchers and vehicles. More extensive testing and qualification is generally performed to help ensure reliability in the more hostile environments encountered at high altitudes and in space (for example ionizing radiation).

References

External links

Flight Test Instrumentation Engineering 1
Flight Test Instrumentation Engineering 2
Practical Aspects of Instrumentation System Installation

Aircraft components